Neide or variant, may refer to:

People
 Neide Van-Dúnem (aka Neide, born 1986) female Angolan singer
 Neide Barbosa (born 1980) female Angolan handball player
 Neide Dias (born 1987) female Angolan runner
 Neide Sá (born 1940) female Brazilian artist
 Neide, a German surname
 Néide mac Onchú (circa 800) male Irish lord

Fictional characters
 Neide Aparecida, a fictional character from the Brazilian sitcom Sai de Baixo

Other uses
 Neides, compounds of neon
 Neide (2010 song), a song off the album Ai se eu te pego! by Brazilian band Cangaia de Jegue

See also

 
 
 Neides, the stilt bugs
 Niedysz (aka Neides), Poland; a village
 Rana Neide, a Sami goddess of spring and fertiity